When Men Would Kill is a 1914 American silent film produced by Sid Films and distributed by Warner's Features. It was directed by Sidney Olcott with Valentine Grant in the leading role.

Cast
 Valentine Grant

Production notes
 The film was shot in Jacksonville, Fla and in New York city.
 It is the first role of Valentine Grant in a film.

External links

  When Men Would Kill website dedicated to Sidney Olcott

1914 films
American silent short films
Films directed by Sidney Olcott
1914 drama films
Silent American drama films
American black-and-white films
1910s American films